Al Ain Football Club is a football club based in Al Ain, Abu Dhabi, United Arab Emirates that competes in Pro League.

History 

Since its founding in 1968, Sheikh Khalifa bin Zayed Al Nahyan, helped the club financially and gave the founders the first club headquarters, became club Honorary President on 13 November 1974. The first board of directors of the club was formed after the merger under the chairmanship Mohammed Salem Al Dhaheri in 1974. On 21 May 1975, Sheikh Sultan bin Zayed Al Nahyan was elected Chairman of Board of Directors. Mohammed Bin Zayed Al Nahyan became president of Al Ain on 19 January 1979.

List of presidents

Board of directors

1974
The first board of directors.Source:

2011–16
From 25 March 2011 To 6 August 2016.Source: 1

2016–19
From 6 August 2016 To 22 June 2019.Source: 2

2019–2022
From 22 June 2019 To 1 September 2022.Source: 3

2022–
From 1 September 2022.Source: 1, 2

References 

 
Presidents